John E. Lookabaugh (September 13, 1922 − May 17, 1993) was an American football end in the National Football League for the Washington Redskins.  He played college football at the University of Maryland.

American football wide receivers
Maryland Terrapins football players
Washington Redskins players
People from Ridgeley, West Virginia
1922 births
1993 deaths
Wilmington Clippers players